The Annacis Island Swing Bridge, built in 1986,
is a road and rail swing bridge over the Annacis Channel of the Fraser River in the Lower Mainland of British Columbia, Canada. The bridge connects the community of Queensborough, part of New Westminster on Lulu Island, to Annacis Island in Delta.

It replaced the Derwent Way Bridge built in 1955 at the same location.

See also 
 List of bridges in Canada

References
 Discover Vancouver - Bridges of Greater Vancouver
 Vancouver History - 1955

Railway bridges in British Columbia
Road-rail bridges
Swing bridges in Canada
Bridges in Greater Vancouver
Bridges completed in 1955
Buildings and structures in Delta, British Columbia
Bridges over the Fraser River
Buildings and structures in New Westminster
Road bridges in British Columbia
Former railway bridges in Canada
1955 establishments in British Columbia